The PBS TS100 is a small turboshaft engine produced by a Czech turbine engine manufacturer PBS Velká Bíteš. The engine with a maximum power of 241 hp (180 kW) has been developed for light helicopters weighing up to 2,204 lb (1,000 kg).

In 2022, the PBS TS100 engine was acquired by the Korean Aerospace Research Institute (KARI) to develop new hybrid propulsion system.

Design 
The PBS TS100 turboshaft engine is equipped with an autonomous oil and fuel system, brushless electric starter generator and a digital ECU. The ECU controls the acceleration and deceleration of the gas generator to maintain a constant output shaft speed. The ECU also provides subsequent automatic cooling of hot components after the engine stops.

The turboshaft engine can be controlled by an analogue or digital interface.

Variants
Two versions of the PBS TS100 engine are available based on the number of rpm:
 PBS TS100 ZA with 5,978 RPM
 PBS TS100DA with 2,158 RPM

Applications 
 Curti Zefhir

Specifications (TS100ZA)

References 

Aircraft engines
Turboshaft engines